Brittain is a surname. Notable people with the surname include:

 Bill Brittain (born 1930), American author
 Donald Brittain (1928–1989), Canadian filmmaker
 Joe Brittain, rugby league footballer of the 1910s, and 1920s
 Marion Luther Brittain (1865–1953), U.S. educator
 Martin Brittain (born 1984), English professional football player
 Neil Brittain, Northern Irish television presenter and journalist
 Paul Brittain, American actor and comedian, Saturday Night Live
 Ronald Brittain, MBE (1899–1981), British Regimental Sergeant Major (R.S.M.)
 Thomas Lewis Brittain (1744–1827), English Dominican
 Vera Brittain (1893–1970), English writer, feminist, and pacifist
 Victoria Brittain (born 1942), British journalist and author
 Wayne Brittain, Australian Football League (AFL) coach